Trial of the Valeyard is a Big Finish Doctor Who audio drama. It was the bonus release of 2013, free for those whose subscription included the audio drama Afterlife. It is scheduled for non-subscriber release in December 2014. It features the final recorded acting performance of Lynda Bellingham, who two months after recording her role as Inquistor Darkel announced that she was fighting cancer; she died on 19 October 2014.

Cast 
 The Doctor – Colin Baker
 The Valeyard – Michael Jayston
 Inquisitor Darkel – Lynda Bellingham

Sixth Doctor audio plays